Stadionul Orăşenesc is a multi-purpose stadium in Ovidiu, Romania. It is currently used mostly for football matches and is the home ground of CSO Ovidiu.

Ovidiu
Football venues in Romania
Buildings and structures in Constanța County
Multi-purpose stadiums in Romania